Bixby Memorial Free Library is a public library located in Vergennes, Vermont. The library serves five Vermont communities: Addison, Ferrisburgh, Panton, Vergennes, and Waltham.

History 
William Gove Bixby was born in Vergennes, Vermont, in 1829, one of four children of William and Lucy Bixby. Except for a short time spent exploring business opportunities in Colorado, he lived most of his life in Vergennes. As a young man he was in business with his father who owned a hardware store in the Sherman Block and he later owned several manufacturing businesses along Otter Creek. He was an avid boater and spent much of his time on Lake Champlain in his boat and on his island in Thorpe’s Cove in Charlotte. Mr. Bixby was fond of fine paintings and good literature. His generosity aided many charitable institutions and churches.

When he died in 1907 he bequeathed money to several institutions and former servants, but the bulk of his estate was left to establish a public library for Vergennes. This was a surprise to all, as he had told no one of his wishes. It should be mentioned that the bulk of his money had come from his sister Eleanor who had been married to a Chicago hotel man. Upon her death her Chicago real estate and wealth of stocks and bonds went to her brother. It was largely these funds which made the building of the Bixby Library possible.

The cornerstone for the Bixby was laid in September 1911. On August 1, 1912, the 3,530 volumes plus public documents, government reports and unbound magazines of the City Library were transferred to the newly opened Bixby Library and dedication ceremonies were held on October 1, 1912. At the dedication, President John M. Thomas of Middlebury College said:“The free public library is one of our great modern democratic institutions. It is supported by all for the uplift of all…This library should be a working tool for this community, entering into every part of its life, industrial, educational, civic and religious.”On November 4, 1912, Bixby Library was first opened for the circulation of books, and every day until November 12, students and their teachers from the elementary and secondary schools visited to sign up for library cards and check out books—a total of 239 students. In addition to providing materials for circulation and places for quiet reading or study, the library was a community center. During World War I, the basement rooms were used by the Red Cross and, thereafter, were available to local residents for rest and relaxation from 9:00 a.m. to 9:00 p.m. daily. By the tenth anniversary celebration on October 5, 1922, an annual circulation exceeding 30,000 was reported, a figure that increased to 39,903 in 1931.

Services 
The Bixby Library's holdings includes books, large print books, audiobooks, DVDs, eBooks, and periodicals. The library provides free WiFi access, public computers, and printing services.

References 

Libraries on the National Register of Historic Places in Vermont
Historic district contributing properties in Vermont
Public libraries in Vermont